Epicondylitis is a type of musculoskeletal disorder that refers to an inflammation of an epicondyle. It is caused by repetitive motion. In athletes, it is linked to poor technique. Nonsurgical treatment is effective in approximately 95% of cases.

Types include:
 Lateral epicondylitis, also known as tennis elbow.
 Medial epicondylitis, also known as golfer's elbow (Also thrower's elbow).

References

Inflammations